The Mitchell Kitalina is an American single place amphibious aircraft.

Design and development
The Kitalina fuselage is built from an EDO 4000 float with a strut-braced high wing from a Luscombe. The engine is forward mounted on the high-wing with a T-tail arrangement.

Specifications (Mitchell Kitalina)

References

Homebuilt aircraft